Johannes Josefsson (28 July 1883 – 4 October 1968) was an Icelandic Glima champion from 1907 to 1908. He was known for travelling around the world and challenging fighters from different martial arts backgrounds. He wrote an English book about Glima in 1908 titled "Icelandic Wrestling".

Jósefsson was born in the north of Iceland in 1883 and became a champion of Icelandic wrestling at an early age. He competed in Greco-Roman wrestling at the 1908 London Olympics, at the age of 25, and came in fourth. He then traveled the world, ending up in America with Barnum & Baileys Greatest Show on Earth, where he performed as an unarmed contender fighting opponents even armed with knives. Josefsson became a wealthy man from his circus activities and returned to Iceland unscathed in 1927. After his return, he invested more than 1 million Krona in the Hotel Borg, for many years Iceland's classiest hotel. Josefsson ran the Borg until 1960, when he retired.

References

Bibliography  
Jóhannes á Borg: Minningar glímukappans. [Josefsson's memoirs, as told to Stefán Jónsson.] Reykjavik. 1964.

Johannes Josefsson
Johannes Josefsson
Johannes Josefsson
Johannes Josefsson
1883 births
1968 deaths
Danish male sport wrestlers
Icelandic male sport wrestlers
Olympic wrestlers of Denmark
Wrestlers at the 1908 Summer Olympics
Johannes Josefsson